Argo Island (also: Island of Arkô and Jezira Argo) is an island of the Nile in Sudan. The island contains a town of the same name and the Nubian archaeology site of Tabo.

References

River islands of Sudan
Islands of the Nile